Kiva (1995) is a collaborative album by the American ambient musicians Steve Roach, Michael Stearns and Ron Sunsinger. A kiva is an underground ceremonial chamber used by Native American cultures of the Southwest.

“East Kiva, ‘Calling in the Midnight Water” is a Peyote ceremony. “South Kiva, ‘Mother Ayahuasca” is an Ayahuasca ceremony from the South American rainforest. “West Kiva, ‘Sacrifice, Prayer and Visions” is a Sundance. The Sundance is an elaborate ceremony used by the tribes of the central plains to seek visions and initiate holy men. “North Kiva, ‘Trust and Remember” is a non-traditional improvisation created by the three artists in a cave in Northern New Mexico.

Track listing
”Passage One” (2:27)
”East Kiva, ‘Calling in the Midnight Water” (13:42)
”Passage Two” (1:59)
”South Kiva, ‘Mother Ayahuasca” (15:13)
”Passage Three” (2:12)
”West Kiva, ‘Sacrifice, Prayer and Visions” (17:27)
”Passage Four” (2:00)
”North Kiva, ‘Trust and Remember” (9:42)
”The Center” (2:33)

References

External links
 Hearts of Space Records (Record label's album page)

1995 albums
Hearts of Space Records albums
Steve Roach (musician) albums
Michael Stearns albums
Collaborative albums
Space music albums by American artists